The HiPhi X  is a 6-seater all-electric battery-powered full-size luxury CUV from the Chinese new energy vehicle brand HiPhi.

Overview

HiPhi 1 Concept
The HiPhi 1 pre-production Concept was publicly unveiled on 31 July 2019 as the production-ready prototype for the HiPhi X production model, which was revealed in September 2020.

Founders Edition
The Founders Edition was the initial version to be launched, which featured limited edition badges and exclusive low profile golden trim parts. Depending on the 6-seater people carrier or 4-seater limousine models, the price is RMB ￥680,000 ($103,000) - RMB ￥800,000 ($121,000).

Production version
The HiPhi X uses split rear doors with suicide doors paired with overhead gull-wing doors on the top section of the doors, making it a 6-door crossover excluding the hatchback. HiPhi refers to this setup as "NT Doors".

Technology
The HiPhi X features four wheel steering and a customizable matrix lighting system. With 562 sensors on the HiPhi X, the vehicle became the first mass-produced vehicle with a 5G-V2X communication network.  HiPhi cars are equipped with Human Oriented Architecture (HOA) developer-endabled electrical architecture, which provides an adaptive user experience.

The HiPhi X is equipped with 4 domain controllers and 6 computing platforms, using data analysis engines and cloud computing to analyze information and make decisions.

Production
The Dongfeng Yueda Kia's plant in Yancheng, Jiangsu Province will accommodate the initial mass production of the HiPhi X electric crossover starting from 2021.

See also

 Tesla Model X
 NIO ES8

References

HiPhi vehicles
Cars introduced in 2020
Full-size sport utility vehicles
Luxury crossover sport utility vehicles
All-wheel-drive vehicles
Automobiles with gull-wing doors
Electric concept cars
Production electric cars
Vehicles with four-wheel steering